Víctor Rodríguez may refer to:

Football
Víctor Rodríguez Andrade (1927–1985), Uruguyan footballer
Víctor Rodolfo Rodríguez (1928–2006), Argentinian footballer and coach of Independiente Medellín, All Boys, Racing Club, Huracán and Los Andes 
Víctor Rodríguez (Andorran footballer) (born 1987), Andorran international footballer
Víctor Rodríguez (Spanish footballer) (born 1989), Spanish footballer
Victor Rodriguez (soccer) (born 1991), American goalkeeper with the Real Monarchs

Others
Vic Rodriguez (born 1961), American baseball player
Vic Rodriguez (lawyer) (born 1973), Filipino lawyer
Víctor Rodríguez (boxer) (born 1995), Venezuelan boxer
Víctor Rodríguez (wrestler) (born 1974), Mexican wrestler
Víctor Rodríguez Núñez (born 1955), Cuban poet and journalist

See also
José Víctor Rodríguez (born 1945), Spanish football coach of Murcia, Albacete, Oviedo and Granada